Wubble may refer to:

 Wubble-U, a British dance music group
 A commonly used metasyntactic variable, alongside wibble, wobble, and flob
Wubble, the 2020 WNBA season

See also
 "Wubble in Paradise", 15th episode of the TV series Yin Yang Yo!
 The Wubbulous World of Dr. Seuss, 1996–1997 US television series
 Wubbzy, fictional protagonist in the American animated television series Wow! Wow! Wubbzy!.